Riocorrente is a 2013 Brazilian drama film written and directed by Paulo Sacramento. The film debuted at the 46th Festival de Brasília in September 2013, where it received the awards for best editing and best cinematography, then at the 37th São Paulo International Film Festival in October 2013, it was chosen as the best Brazilian Film according to criticism Abraccine.

Plot
Carlos, Renata and Marcelo form a love triangle contextualized in the chaotic routine of a metropolis like São Paulo. Carlos tries to look after the kid Exu, but he spends all day on the streets of the city.

Cast
Simone Iliescu as Renata
Lee Taylor as Carlos
Roberto Audio as Marcelo
Vinicius Dos Anjos as Exu

References

External links
  
 

Brazilian drama films
2013 drama films
Films shot in São Paulo
Films set in São Paulo
2013 films
2010s Portuguese-language films